2019 World Masters Athletics Indoor Championships is the eighth in a series of World Masters Athletics Indoor Championships (also called World Masters Athletics Championships Indoor, or WMACi). This eighth edition took place in Toruń, Poland, from 24 to 30 March 2019.

The main venue was Arena Toruń, which has a banked six-lane indoor track

where the turns are raised to neutralize the centrifugal force of athletes running the curves. Supplemental venues included Municipal Stadium for throws, and Rudelka Park for Cross Country.

This Championships was organized by World Masters Athletics (WMA) in coordination with a Local Organising Committee (LOC): Sandy Pashkin, Brian Keaveney, Wackaw Krankowski.

The WMA is the global governing body of the sport of athletics for athletes 35 years of age or older, setting rules for masters athletics competition.

A full range of indoor track and field events were held.

In addition to indoor competition, non-stadia events included Half Marathon,

8K Cross Country, 10K Race Walk, 10K Road Race,

Weight Throw, Hammer Throw, Discus Throw and Javelin Throw.

Results
Official daily results are archived at domtel-sport.pl.

Past Championships results are archived at WMA.

as a searchable pdf.

Additional archives are available from European Masters Athletics

as a searchable pdf,

USATF Masters keeps a list of American record holders.

wmaci2023, the site that hosts the next (ninth) edition of the series (also in Toruń), publishes a list of world records set at the eighth edition.

Several masters world records were set at this Indoor Championships. World records for 2019 are from the list of World Records in the European Masters Athletics searchable pdf unless otherwise noted.

Women

Men

References

External links

World Masters Athletics Championships
World Masters Athletics Championships
International athletics competitions hosted by Poland
2019
Masters athletics (track and field) records